The term end organ or end-organ has two meanings in medicine:
 A small organ at the terminal end of a nerve conduction pathway
 Bulbous corpuscle (Ruffini corpuscle end-organ)
 Tactile corpuscle (Meissner corpuscle end-organ)
 Merkel nerve ending (Merkel corpuscle end-organ)
 Neuromuscular junction (motor end-organ)
 Lamellar corpuscle (Pacinian corpuscle end-organ)
 The ultimately affected organ in a chain of events, such as a disease process (pathophysiology) or a drug's mechanism of action (sometimes called a target organ in this sense)
 End organ damage, disease of such organs
 Ambulatory blood pressure § Target organ damage
 Sepsis § End-organ dysfunction
 HFE hereditary haemochromatosis § End-organ damage